Charles-Hippolyte Pouthas (19 July 1886 – 2 May 1974) was a French historian specialist of political and religious history of contemporary France.

Pouthas was honorary headmaster of the lycée Malherbe de Caen. He was a professor of contemporary history at the lycée Janson-de-Sailly then at the University of Paris and director of the Revue d'histoire moderne et contemporaine.

His work on the Second Empire participated to a reassessment from the "black legend" spread by the Republican and liberal historiography of the last third of the nineteenth century, and introduced a more moderate reading of the regime.

With Jules Isaac and André Alba, he was the author of history textbooks on France.

His research notes are kept at the Archives nationales under the symbols AB/XIX/3754 to AB/XIX/3782.

Publications 
(see Complete list of publications)
1911: La Constituante et la classe ouvrière, Annales révolutionnaires
1911: Les Collèges de Caen au XVIIIe, Caen, L. Jouan
1918–1920 Les Élections de Guizot dans le Calvados, Mémoires de l'Académie nationale des sciences, arts et belles-lettres de Caen
1923: Essai critique sur les sources et la bibliographie de Guizot pendant la Restauration
1923: Guizot pendant la Restauration, : préparation de l'homme d'État (1814–1830)
1934: Une famille de bourgeoisie française de Louis XIV à Napoléon
1936: La Jeunesse de Guizot : 1787-1814
1943: L'Église et les questions religieuses sous la Monarchie constitutionnelle 1814–1848, Centre de Documentation Universitaire
1943: L'Église et les questions Religieuses depuis 1848, Centre de Documentation Universitaire
1945: L'Église catholique de l'avènement de Pie VII à l'avènement de Pie IX
1946: Le Mouvement des nationalités en Europe dans la première moitié du XIXe
1948: Histoire de l'Égypte
1948: Démocraties et capitalisme (1848–1860)
1952: La Révolution de 1848 en France et la Seconde république
1952: Le Pontificat de Pie IX
1953: Documents diplomatiques du Gouvernement provisoire et de la Commission du pouvoir exécutif...
1956: La Population française pendant la première moitié du XIX, Institut national d'études démographique, cahier n° 25, Paris, Presses universitaires de France
1956: Histoire politique du Second Empire
1956: L'Europe occidentale de 1815 à 1848

References

External links 
 Charles-Hippolyte Pouthas on data.bnf.fr
 Notice on Prosopo
 Biography on Jstor

20th-century French historians
French historians of religion
1886 births
Writers from Caen
1974 deaths